A Can of Bees is the debut album by English band The Soft Boys. The album was reissued in 1984 with a different track listing on the second side.  
Both versions of Side 2 appear on the CD reissue first put out by Two Crabs in 1990, subsequently reissued by Rykodisc in 1992, and released again by Yep Roc in 2010.

Track listing

1984 reissue track listing

1992 CD reissue track listing

Personnel 
Robyn Hitchcock – guitar, vocals
 Kimberley Rew – guitar
Jim Melton – harmonica, percussion
 Gerry Hale – violin
Andy Metcalfe – bass
Morris Windsor – drums
Technical
Mike Kemp – engineer

References

The Soft Boys album 'A Can of Bees' was 
released in 1980 by Aura Records (AUL 709).

The Soft Boys albums
1979 debut albums